Louis Durant (25 September 1910, in Topeka, Kansas – 13 February 1972, in San Bernardino, California) was an American racecar driver.  He was born "Durant Lewis" and grew up in Herington, Kansas.  He changed his name when he began driving race cars.

Durant was a member of one of  the most exclusive clubs in the world, the 100 Mile Per Hour Club.   To qualify for membership, drivers were required to complete the Indianapolis 500-mile Race without relief while averaging over 100 miles an hour. Louis Durant drove a 1938 Alfa-Romeo 308 C Special Race Car in the Indianapolis 500 Race in 1946 and finished in 6th place.

Indy 500 results

References

1910 births
1972 deaths
Indianapolis 500 drivers
Sportspeople from Topeka, Kansas
Racing drivers from Kansas
People from Herington, Kansas